P. pensylvanica  may refer to:
 Parietaria pensylvanica, a flowering plant species native to much of North America
 Prunus pensylvanica, the pin cherry or fire cherry, a tree species

See also
 Pensylvanica